The golden-ringed dragonfly (Cordulegaster boltonii) is a large, striking dragonfly and the longest British species, the only member of its genus to be found in the United Kingdom.

Identification
They are easily identified by their distinctive black and yellow stripes, which no other dragonfly in the United Kingdom has.  A very large species, males average 74 mm and the larger females 84 mm. Wingspan is up to 101 mm.

Larvae
The female lays the eggs in shallow water. The hairy larvae live at the bottom of the water and are well camouflaged amongst the silt. They emerge after about 2–5 years, and usually under the cover of darkness.

Behaviour
They are often seen flying leisurely over mountain streams or a river; they also occasionally show up at a pond. They are also typically seen flying over heath land. Their bright yellow and black stripes make them easy to identify, even from a fair distance away. They feed mainly on insects ranging from small prey such as midges to flies, butterflies and even bumblebees. This strikingly-coloured insect is incredibly aerobatic and they sometimes fly very high up into the sky.

See also
 List of British dragonflies

References

External links

Cordulegastridae
Dragonflies of Europe
Insects described in 1807